Union Township is a township in Sullivan County, in the U.S. state of Missouri.

Union Township was erected in 1872.

References

Townships in Missouri
Townships in Sullivan County, Missouri